Karl Wolfgang Franz Count Motesiczky (born 25 May 1904, in Vienna; d. 25 June 1943, in Auschwitz) was an Austrian psychoanalyst and an active opponent of National Socialism. Posthumously, he was honoured as a Righteous Among the Nations.

Life 
Karl Motesiczky is descended from a wealthy Viennese aristocratic family. The family had a huge manor in Hinterbrühl at the Kröpfelsteig. His father died in 1909. His mother, Baroness Henriette von Motesiczky, born von Lieben, raised him, teaching him a democratic point of view.

Motesiczky studied in Vienna, first cello, then law. In 1925 he became friends with the author Heimito von Doderer. He organised readings in Vienna and later in Heidelberg for him. In 1928 he went to Heidelberg, in 1930 to Marburg, where he studied philosophy and theology. Due to his commitment to the socialist student movement, he also came in contact with Communism.

In 1931 he moved to Berlin, where he met the Viennese psychoanalyst Wilhelm Reich. He became his patient, student, and colleague. 1933 they emigrated together from Copenhagen to Oslo. In Oslo Reich continued his work. Motesiczky was his colleague, and the financial backer of Reich's Zeitschrift für Politische Psychologie und Sexualökonomie (Magazine for Political Psychology and Sexual Economy)

Between 1934 and 1938 Motesiczky published several political articles for this magazine under the pseudonym Karl Teschitz, and a book, Religion, Kirche, Religionsstreit in Deutschland. (Religion, Church, and Religious Disputes in Germany) In Oslo he studied medicine and treated patients by psychoanalysis under Reich's supervision. He returned to Austria in the winter of 1937/38. Though of Jewish descent, he stayed in Austria after the Nazis took over in March 1938. His mother and sister Marie-Louise escaped to the Netherlands and then to London.

The Resistance 
His mansion in Hinterbrühl became a meeting point for Jewish families and non-Jewish opponents of National Socialism, for example the pianists Erna Gál and Isa Strasser, as well as Ernst Wildgans, the Przibrams and Dr. Ella and Kurt Lingens. If someone was in danger of getting captured by Gestapo, he would harbour them and he helped a lot of them to emigrate. In the autumn of 1939 he founded a resistance group with some friends, (including Ella and Kurt Lingens and Robert Lammer) He continued the study of medicine, but due to his Jewish origins he was forbidden to become a psychotherapist.

In July 1942 two couples fleeing from occupied Kracow came to Vienna, in order to get to Switzerland with his help. Denounced by an intermediary, Motesiczky was arrested together with Ella Lingens by the Gestapo; after four months in the Gestapo prison in Vienna, he was deported to Auschwitz, where he died of typhus on 25 June 1943.

Heritage 
In 1980 Karl Motesiczky was awarded the honour medal Righteous Among the Nations by Yad Vashem in Jerusalem.

His memory was honoured in August 2019 by the Raoul Wallenberg Foundation, who designated the Motesiczkys’ former property at Hinterbrühl, as one of the ‘Houses of Life’ to acknowledge the sacrifice that Karl Motesiczky and his companions made in sheltering those fleeing from or resisting Nazism. The property was restituted to his mother and sister after the War and sold by them in the mid-fifties to the international charity, SOS Kinderdorf, which runs a chain of ‘villages’ worldwide for humanitarian work with children. His Mother and his sister also arranged for a memorial to be built there for Karl in 1961. Motesiczky's memorial was destroyed in summer of 2000 and defaced with swastikas. In 2007 a Stolperstein was placed in front of the main building of the SOS-Children's Villages.

Publications 
 Religion, Kirche, Religionsstreit in Deutschland. Kopenhagen: Sexpol-Verlag 1935 (Politisch-Psychologische Schriftenreihe der Sexpol Nr. 3)
 Religiöse Ekstase als Ersatz der sexuellen Auslösung: Beobachtungen in einer religiösen Sekte. Kopenhagen: Sexpol-Verlag 1937 (Populäre Schriftenreihe der Sexpol Nr. 2) (online)
 Publication is the Zeitschrift für Politische Psychologie und Sexualökonomie (ZPPS) Reprinted in Hans-Peter Gente (Hg.): Marxismus, Psychoanalyse, Sexpol. Band 1. Frankfurt/M: Fischer-TB 1970
 Zur Kritik der kommunistischen Politik in Deutschland (ZPPS 3/4, 1934, S. 256–258), S. 203–219
 Aus der internationalen Sexpol-Diskussion (ZPPS 1/2, 1936, S. 43–49), S. 221–228 (online)
 Rezension: Erich Fromm: Autorität und Familie. Sozialpsychologischer Teil (ZPPS 3/4, 1936, S. 176–178), S. 307–309 (online)

References 

 Christiane Rothländer: Karl Motesiczky (1904–1943). Dissertation am Institut für Zeitgeschichte der Universität Wien, Wien 2005 (Christiane Rothländer, Karl Motesiczky. (Kurzfassung))
 Christiane Rothländer: Karl Motesiczky. Eine biographische Rekonstruktion. Wien: Turia & Kant [Sept.] 2009  (Überarbeitete Dissertation)
 Ausstellungskatalog: Die Liebens. 150 Jahre Geschichte einer Wiener Familie, Böhlau-Verlag, Wien 2004 (Ausstellung im Wiener Jüdischen Museum vom 11.November 2004 bis 3.April 2005)

External links 

 Dokumentation  about the Austrian Righteous
 Karl Motesiczky – his activity to save Jews' lives during the Holocaust, at Yad Vashem website

Psychoanalysts from Vienna
Austrian resistance members
1904 births
1943 deaths
Austrian Righteous Among the Nations
People from Vienna
Austrian people who died in Auschwitz concentration camp
The Holocaust in Austria
Resistance members who died in Nazi concentration camps
Austrian civilians killed in World War II
Counts of Austria
Nobility from Vienna
Austrian people of Hungarian descent
20th-century Austrian physicians
Deaths from typhus
Infectious disease deaths in Poland